Kahla Village is a village located in the extreme south of Saudi Arabia close to the border with Yemen, part of Asir region.

Population 
The village hosts approximately 2000 people, according to the latest statistics. Kahla is home to the AalShban and Maqbol clans of All taleed tribe.

Climate 
The climate is moderate in summer and cold in winter.

Natural resources 
Vegetation includes grasslands and pine forest. Other resources include fishing for hares, bustard and alobran.

Populated places in 'Asir Province